Maramadi is a type of cattle race conducted in Indian state Kerala. It also known as  Kalappoottu, or pothottam. The race is a traditional event, usually with bullocks, held after the monsoon but before the cattle are needed for planting.

Legal status 
In 2011 the Central Government banned the exhibition and training of bulls, and five other animals, as performing animals under the Prevention of Cruelty to Animals Act, 1960.  In 2014 a court ruling held that this ban applied to the Kerala cattle race.  In 2015 the ruling was upheld on appeal to the Kerala High Court by the Cattle Race Club of India.

Gallery

See also 

 Kambala

References

Further reading

"Cattle race", National Geographic, photo contest 2014

Articles containing video clips
Sport in Kerala
Animal racing